Paper currency grading is the process of determining the grade or condition of a bank note, one of the key factors in determining its value. A banknotes grade is generally determined by crispness (Rigid, not limp paper), brightness, and depth of color. Other factors that are taken into consideration include centering of the printed area, artificially suppressed folds, repairs, and pinholes. Certification services professionally grade banknotes for tiered fees.

United States

United States banknotes are graded by a system much like the 70 points Sheldon coin grading scale which is used for coins. Top-quality grades include "Gem" or "Choice" condition which is usually dubbed as "New" by sellers down to "poor" for notes barely identifiable. Paper money, in general, can become "ugly" over time which in turn affects eye appeal and value as it does with coins.

Circulated grades

See also
Coin grading
Numismatics

References

Banknotes
Currency
Numismatics